In mathematics, a hyperbolic manifold is a space where every point looks locally like hyperbolic space of some dimension. They are especially studied in dimensions 2 and 3, where they are called hyperbolic surfaces and hyperbolic 3-manifolds, respectively. In these dimensions, they are important because most manifolds can be made into a hyperbolic manifold by a homeomorphism. This is a consequence of the uniformization theorem for surfaces and the geometrization theorem for 3-manifolds proved by Perelman.

Rigorous Definition
A hyperbolic -manifold is a complete Riemannian -manifold of constant sectional curvature .

Every complete, connected, simply-connected manifold of constant negative curvature  is isometric to the real hyperbolic space . The manifold has finite volume if and only if  is a lattice.

Its thick–thin decomposition has a thin part consisting of tubular neighborhoods of closed geodesics and ends which are the product of a Euclidean-manifold and the closed half-ray. The manifold is of finite volume if and only if its thick part is compact.

Examples

The simplest example of a hyperbolic manifold is hyperbolic space, as each point in hyperbolic space has a neighborhood isometric to hyperbolic space.

A simple non-trivial example, however, is the once-punctured torus. This is an example of an (Isom())-manifold. This can be formed by taking an ideal rectangle in  – that is, a rectangle where the vertices are on the boundary at infinity, and thus don't exist in the resulting manifold – and identifying opposite images.

In a similar fashion, we can construct the thrice-punctured sphere, shown below, by gluing two ideal triangles together. This also shows how to draw curves on the surface – the black line in the diagram becomes the closed curve when the green edges are glued together. As we are working with a punctured sphere, the colored circles in the surface – including their boundaries – are not part of the surface, and hence are represented in the diagram as ideal vertices.

Important Results
For  the hyperbolic structure on a finite volume hyperbolic -manifold is unique by Mostow rigidity and so geometric invariants are in fact topological invariants. One of these geometric invariants used as a topological invariant is the hyperbolic volume of a knot or link complement, which can allow us to distinguish two knots from each other by studying the geometry of their respective manifolds.

We can also ask what the area of the boundary of the knot complement is. As there is a relationship between the volume of a knot complement and the volume of the complement under Dehn filling, we can use the area of the boundary to inform us of how the volume might change under such a filling.

See also

 Hyperbolic 3-manifold
 Hyperbolic space
 Hyperbolization theorem
 Margulis lemma
 Normally hyperbolic invariant manifold

References

Hyperbolic geometry
Manifolds
Riemannian manifolds